Half-Life is a debut novel by Aaron Krach.  Published in 2004 by Alyson Books, the novel was nominated for a Violet Quill Award and was among the 2004 Lambda Literary Award finalists.  It discusses young love, coping with death and the issues facing gay youth.

Plot introduction
Two weeks before high school graduation and the geography of 18-year-old Adam Westman's life is about to change dramatically. Many of the familiar landmarks will remain—his best friend Dart riding shotgun; the suburban house where he lives with his dad and younger sister; and the numerous on-ramps and off-ramps that connect him to his hometown of Angelito in the center of centerless Los Angeles. But when death and love, perhaps, arrive unexpectedly, Adam must learn that trouble sometimes has to rumble through a tidy world to make room for the kind of magical connections that make life worth living.

Reception
Half-Life was published to critical acclaim by Alyson Books in 2004.   Of Half-Life, Reed Business Information wrote "Gay readers will relish the attention lavished on love's growing pains and the smart dialogue between Adam and his high school buddy".

“Aaron’s writing glides like the camera in a Robert Altman ensemble piece, picking up and illuminating details to slowly, invisibly build a greater whole. There’s not a word, sentence or piece of dialogue out of place, or unnecessary, in this beautifully rendered meditation on human nature and relationships.” —Gay Times

“Krach’s engrossing tale offers much insight into various worlds —from that of gay teens who chill in 7-Eleven parking lots to the emotional landscapes of loss and mourning to young, fresh love.” —Beth Greenfield, Time Out New York

Nominations
2004, nominated for Lambda Literary Award
2004, nominated for a Violet Quill Award

References

External links
Alyson Books

2004 American novels
Novels set in Los Angeles
American LGBT novels
2000s LGBT novels
Gay male teen fiction
LGBT-related young adult novels
2004 debut novels
Alyson Books books
2004 LGBT-related literary works